Bostonian (foaled in 1924) was an American Thoroughbred racehorse. The son of Broomstick out of a Peter Pan mare Yankee Maid, Bostonian is best remembered for posting a 1-1/2 length win over his stablemate and Kentucky Derby Champion Whiskery in the mile and three sixteenth $65,000 Preakness Stakes at Pimlico Race Course on May 9, 1927

Two-year-old season 
As a two-year-old, Bostonian broke his maiden in the second start of his career. In his third start, he won an allowance race at Belmont Park in May 1926 for the second win of his career. He went on to place second in a prestigious stakes race at Belmont, running second to Draconia in the Tremont Stakes during the first week of July in his freshman season. His trainer, Fred Hopkins, wheeled him back three weeks later to a third-place finish in the Sanford Memorial Stakes at Saratoga Race Course. In the early autumn, Bostonian won another allowance race. His owners then shipped him west to run at Churchill Downs in the Kentucky Jockey Club Stakes, where he finished second to Valorous. During the winter, his connections decided to freshen him until the spring.

Three-year-old season 
Bostonian got a late start to his three-year-old season, making his sophomore debut in New York's key prep race to the Derby, the Wood Memorial Stakes at a mile and one eighth at Aqueduct Racetrack. He ran third to Greentree Stable's Saxon in only the third running of the Wood. In his second start of the year, Bostonian finished fifth in a field of sixteen in the Kentucky Derby to his stablemate Whiskery, also owned by Harry Payne Whitney.

Two weeks later, Hopkins wheeled him back to take on Derby champ Whiskery in the second jewel of Triple Crown, the Preakness Stakes. In that race, Bostonian was sent off as favorite coupled (under the same ownership) with Whiskery at 3-1. As the gates opened, Bostonian broke slowly and settle in seventh in the field of twelve passing the grand stands for the first time and around the club house turn. In the back stretch, he gradually gained ground on the early leaders. Around the final turn, he responded with a burst of speed when called on by his jockey, Whitey Abel. He came up to the leaders on the outside at the top of the lane during the final drive. Then he wore down the top three entering the home stretch: Sir Harry in third, Black Panther in second and finally Whiskery at the sixteenth pole by a half length. He continued his strong drive to win by one and a half lengths in a time of 1:59.

Later that year, Bostonian won a handicap race over older horses in the Riggs Memorial Handicap at Pimlico Race Course over a mile and three sixteenths. He also ran third in the Havre De Grace Cup Handicap at Havre de Grace Racetrack in Havre de Grace, Maryland, at one and one eighth miles on dirt.

Breeding

References

 Bostonian's pedigree and partial racing stats

1924 racehorse births
Racehorses bred in Kentucky
Racehorses trained in the United States
Preakness Stakes winners
Thoroughbred family 2-c